Steven DaLuz (born 1953) is a contemporary American Neoluminist artist known for using chemically induced patinas on metal leaf and mixed media to produce figurative works and imagined landscapes often reflecting upon the sublime as a pictorial theme.

DaLuz was born in Hanford, California. His works have been published in art periodicals, such as American Art Collector, Fine Art Connoisseur, The Artist, Professional Artist, The Huffington Post and Poets and Artists magazine, where he received the cover for the Nov 2009 Issue. Considered "ethereal and transcendent", his artwork has been said to combine "a spectacular dissertation on light and shadow with a brilliant collection of colors". DaLuz holds degrees in Social Psychology (BA, Park University 1979), Management ((MA, Central Michigan University, 1981)), Graphic Design (AAS, San Antonio College, 2001), and Fine Arts (BFA, University of Texas at San Antonio, 2003).

He donates works of art and part of the proceeds from the sale of his work in favor of many charitable actions.

References

Living people
1953 births
American male painters
20th-century American painters
21st-century American painters
Luminism (American art style)
20th-century American male artists